Shirinu or Shirinnu or Shirino or Shirinoo may refer to:
 Shirinu, Bushehr
 Shirinu, Fars